Gladys Smith Gunzer (November 12, 1939 – June 13, 2016) was a noted American medalist and sculptor. She was the first woman chosen to design an official United States presidential inaugural medal.

Biography
Gunzer was born in North Wilkesboro, North Carolina in 1939. She studied fine arts at the Women's College of the University of North Carolina, but left in order to raise her family. She was hired by the Medallic Art Company in 1972 and worked there until 1990, working her way up to senior sculptor and manager of the firm's art department. She then moved to Arizona and worked as a freelance medallic sculptor.

Notable works

1980 Winter Olympics Medals
 1984 IEEE Centennial Medal
 2000 IEEE Third Millennial Medal
2005 United States Presidential Inaugural Medal

References

External links
 Gladys Gunzer obituary  
 Gunzer, Gladys Smith, in Dick Johnson's Databank of Medal Artists

20th-century American sculptors
1939 births
2016 deaths
American women sculptors
People from North Wilkesboro, North Carolina
20th-century American women artists
21st-century American women